Sărulești may refer to several places in Romania:

 Sărulești, Buzău, a commune in Buzău County
 Sărulești, Călărași, a commune in Călărași County
 Sărulești, a village in Lăpușata Commune, Vâlcea County

See also 
 Sarata (disambiguation)
 Sărățel (disambiguation)
 Sărăteni (disambiguation)